CION or cion can refer to:
 An alternative spelling of Scion, the upper part of a grafted plant
 CION-FM, a French-language Canadian radio station located in Quebec City, Quebec

See also
Ciona, a genus of Chordata animals
 Cionodon, a genus of dinosaur from the Late Cretaceous Period
Cionus, a genus of weevils in family Curculionidae